Vatslav Vatslavovich Mikhalsky (born June 27, 1938) is a Soviet and Russian writer, screenwriter and editor.

Mikhalsky was born in the city of Taganrog in 1938. In 1965 he graduated from the Maxim Gorky Literature Institute. In 1975 - higher courses for specialists and cinema directors at Goskino. In 1990 - general director and chief editor of the publishing house Soglasiye.

Awards
 State Prize of the Russian Federation of 2002 for his novel The Spring in Carthage.

Novels
 «Баллада о старом оружии» (1964)
 «Катенька» (1965)
 «Семнадцать левых сапог» (1967)
 «Тайные милости» (1982)

cycle of novels dedicated to the first wave of Russian immigration:
 «The Spring in Carthage» (2001)
 «Одинокому везде пустыня» (2003)
 «Для радости нужны двое» (2006)
 «Храм согласия» (2008)
 «Прощеное воскресенье» (2009).

Screenplay
 Za chto? (1991) (novel "Semnadtsat levykh sapog") (screenplay)
...  Why? (International: English title)
... a.k.a. Semnadtsat levykh sapog (Russia)

 Katenka (1987) (writer)
... a.k.a. Катенька (Soviet Union: Russian title)
 Ballada o starom oruzhii (1986) (book) (screenplay)

External links
 

1938 births
Living people
Soviet screenwriters
20th-century Russian screenwriters
Male screenwriters
Writers from Taganrog
20th-century Russian male writers
Maxim Gorky Literature Institute alumni